Ceranthia lichtwardtiana is a species of tachinid flies in the genus Ceranthia of the family Tachinidae.

Distribution
United Kingdom, Austria, Switzerland, Germany.

Hosts
Eupithecia sp. and Acasis viretata.

References

Diptera of Europe
Tachininae
Insects described in 1931
Taxa named by Joseph Villeneuve de Janti